Collage is the fourth studio album by the American jazz singer Karrin Allyson. The album was recorded in the Soundtrek Studios of Kansas City, Missouri, and was released on June 30, 1996, by the Concord Jazz label.

Reception
Owen Curdle of JazzTimes mentioned: "Allyson, who lives in Kansas City, is a hard-working singer who is good at a lot of things. On 'It Could Happen To You'/'Fried Bananas,' she is cool and seductive. Later, she sings 'Autumn Leaves' in French and 'Faltando Um Pedaco' in Portuguese. On Jay Leonhart's 'Robert Frost' and Billy Joel's 'And So It Goes,' there's a bit of the Elizabethan folk-singer in her presentation. Her versions of Clifford Brown's 'Joy Spring' and Ray Noble's 'Cherokee' are fine bebop displays. She also demonstrates a flair for the blues, on Bonnie Raitt's 'Give It Up Or Let Me Go.' Then there's Monk's 'Ask Me Now.' The album includes an almost all-K.C. cast." AllMusic's Scott Yanow wrote: "Vocalist Karrin Allyson stretches herself during this diverse set... With assistance from her fine Kansas City-based rhythm section...and with some worthy guests...Karrin Allyson shows just how versatile and talented a singer she is. Recommended."

Track listing

References

1996 albums
Karrin Allyson albums